Beacon Hill, Colkirk, Norfolk is a high point, once the site of a beacon forming part of a chain from the North Norfolk Coast to London.  The approximate location of the beacon is two kilometres to the west of the village of Colkirk, N52:48:15 E0:49:29.

External links
Map

Hills of Norfolk